Villa Alegre, Santa Cruz is a neighbourhood located in the Chilean commune of Santa Cruz, Colchagua province.

References 

Neighbourhoods in Santa Cruz, Chile